Plesiocathartes is an extinct genus of birds that lived during the Eocene to Oligocene period. It currently presents 5 species from Europe and North America. It was originally described related to New World vultures, but however recent studies has uncovered that the genus was more closely related to the cuckoo roller from Madagascar.

References
 The first New World occurrence of the Eocene bird Plesiocathartes (Aves: ?Leptosomidae) Researchgate.net Retrieved June 2018.

Coraciiformes
Eocene birds
Oligocene birds
Prehistoric birds of Europe
Fossil taxa described in 1908
Prehistoric bird genera